The Maastricht Formation (Dutch: Formatie van Maastricht; abbreviation: MMa), named after the city of Maastricht in the Netherlands, is a geological formation in the Netherlands and Belgium whose strata date back to the Late Cretaceous, within 500,000 years of the Cretaceous–Paleogene boundary, now dated at . It crops out in southern parts of Dutch and Belgian Limburg and adjacent areas in Germany. It can be found in the subsurface of northern Belgium and southeastern Netherlands, especially in the Campine Basin and Roer Valley Graben. Dinosaur remains are among the fossils that have been recovered from the formation.

Lithology 
The Maastricht Formation consists of soft, sandy shallow marine limestone (in Limburg locally called "mergel"), in fact chalk and calcareous arenite. These lithologies locally alternate with thin bands of marl or clay. The lower parts of the formation contain flint concretions. The upper parts can have shellrich layers. Its age is between about 70 and 66 million years, which puts it in the Maastrichtian, a stage that was named after the formation. The top of the formation has been identified as Danian (early Paleocene) in age. The type locality is at the ruins of Lichtenberg castle on Mount Saint Peter, Maastricht.

Stratigraphy 
The Maastricht Formation was first described by Belgian geologist André Dumont in 1849. The formation is subdivided in seven members, from top to bottom these are the Meerssen Member, Nekum Member, Emael Member, Schiepersberg Member, Gronsveld Member, Valkenburg Member and Kunrade Member. The members are often hard to distinguish.

The Maastricht Formation is overlain by the Paleocene Houthem Formation and was deposited on top of the older Gulpen Formation.

Vertebrate paleofauna

Dinosaurs

Mammals

Mosasaurs

Testudines 

 Glyptochelone suyckerbuyki
 Allopleuron hoffmani

Invertebrates

See also 

 List of dinosaur-bearing rock formations

References 

Geologic formations of the Netherlands
Geologic formations of Belgium
Upper Cretaceous Series of Europe
Mesozoic Belgium
Cretaceous Netherlands
 
Cretaceous–Paleogene boundary
Paleocene Series of Europe
Paleogene Belgium
Paleogene Netherlands
Danian Stage
Chalk
Open marine deposits
Fossiliferous stratigraphic units of Europe
Paleontology in the Netherlands
Formation